Oberwaldberg is a mountain of Hesse, Germany.

Mountains of Hesse